Tower Hamlets London Borough Council is the local authority for the London Borough of Tower Hamlets in Greater London, England. The council is unusual in that its executive function is controlled by a directly elected mayor of Tower Hamlets, currently Lutfur Rahman.

Following the May 2014 election, Tower Hamlets London Borough Council was composed of 22 Labour Party members, 19 Tower Hamlets First members and 5 Conservative Party members. Following the removal of Lutfur Rahman as mayor and Alibor Choudhury as councillor, Tower Hamlets First was removed from the Electoral Commission register of political parties, with Labour's Sabina Akhtar replacing Choudhury as councillor for Stepney Green and John Biggs replacing Rahman as Mayor, following the by-elections in June 2015. Lutfur Rahman was again elected as Mayor in the 2022 London Borough elections, beating incumbent Labour Mayor John Biggs.

The council was created by the London Government Act 1963 and replaced three local authorities: Bethnal Green Metropolitan Borough Council, Poplar Metropolitan Borough Council and Stepney Metropolitan Borough Council.

History
There have previously been a number of local authorities responsible for the Tower Hamlets area. The current local authority was first elected in 1964, a year before formally coming into its powers and prior to the creation of the London Borough of Tower Hamlets on 1 April 1965. Tower Hamlets London Borough Council replaced Bethnal Green Metropolitan Borough Council, Poplar Metropolitan Borough Council and Stepney Metropolitan Borough Council. All three had been created in 1900, in Bethnal Green the borough council replaced the parish vestry and in Poplar the council replaced the board of works; both authorities had been incorporated by the Metropolis Management Act 1855. Stepney had a more convoluted history with the metropolitan borough council established in 1900 replacing the Limehouse District Board of Works, the Whitechapel District Board of Works and the parish vestries of Mile End Old Town and St George in the East.

It was envisaged that through the London Government Act 1963 Tower Hamlets as a London local authority would share power with the Greater London Council. The split of powers and functions meant that the Greater London Council was responsible for "wide area" services such as fire, ambulance, flood prevention, and refuse disposal; with the local authorities responsible for "personal" services such as social care, libraries, cemeteries and refuse collection. This arrangement lasted until 1986 when Tower Hamlets London Borough Council gained responsibility for some services that had been provided by the Greater London Council, such as waste disposal. Tower Hamlets became an education authority in 1990. Since 2000 the Greater London Authority has taken some responsibility for highways and planning control from the council, but within the English local government system the council remains a "most purpose" authority in terms of the available range of powers and functions.

In September 2008, Tower Hamlets London Borough Council named two tower blocks in Sidney Street Peter House and Painter House, even though Peter the Painter was only involved in a minor capacity in the robbery, was not present at the siege of Sidney Street, and may not have existed at all. A local councillor and the Metropolitan Police Federation protested against this, saying that he should not be honoured.

Following a local referendum on 6 May 2010, a directly elected executive mayor system of local government commenced with the election on 21 October 2010 of Lutfur Rahman as mayor. Rahman was re-elected at the 2014 mayoral election, but the result of this election was cancelled and declared null and void on 23 April 2015 when the Election Court officially reported Rahman to be guilty of corrupt or illegal practices, or both (electoral fraud) under the Representation of the People Act 1983. He was thus removed from his office with immediate effect and was also personally debarred from standing for elected office until 2021. A BBC article in 2018 stated that "Police investigating electoral fraud during the 2014 Tower Hamlets mayoral election have not found sufficient evidence to charge anyone".

Powers and functions
The local authority derives its powers and functions from the London Government Act 1963 and subsequent legislation, and has the powers and functions of a London borough council. It sets council tax and as a billing authority also collects precepts for Greater London Authority functions and business rates. It sets planning policies which complement Greater London Authority and national policies, and decides on almost all planning applications accordingly.  It is a local education authority  and is also responsible for council housing, social services, libraries, waste collection and disposal, traffic, and most roads and environmental health.

Policies
From 1986 to 1994 the council experimented with decentralisation of services to seven neighbourhood areas.

Summary results of elections

Previous election results are as follows:

List of councillors
The councillors before and after the 2022 elections were as follows:

See also
London Borough of Tower Hamlets
Mayor of Tower Hamlets
List of public art in the London Borough of Tower Hamlets

References

Local authorities in London
London borough councils
Politics of the London Borough of Tower Hamlets
Mayor and cabinet executives
Local education authorities in England
Billing authorities in England